Unión Fenosa, S.A. was, until its acquisition by Gas Natural in 2009, a large Spanish company dedicated to the production and distribution of gas and electricity.

It installed capacity of 11,120 megawatts of power and 8.9 million customers. The headquarters were in Madrid and the chairman was Pedro López Jiménez. Formerly a constituent of the IBEX 35 index, the company is a part of the Naturgy Energy Group.

History

The company was founded in 1912 as Unión Eléctrica Madrileña and it traded under that name until 1970 when the name was changed to Unión Eléctrica. In 1982 it merged with Fuerza Eléctrica de Noroeste, S.A. (Fenosa) to form Unión Eléctrica Fenosa. In 2000 the name was shortened to Unión Fenosa. In 2008 the company was acquired by the Gas Natural group.

Carbon intensity

Structure
The company had the following businesses:
 Domestic generation and marketing
 Domestic distribution
 Gas
 International electrical business
 Other interests
 Indra (11%)

Shareholders
Prior to 2008 around 45% of the shares were owned by Grupo ACS. In July 2008, Gas Natural agreed to buy Grupo ACS's stake worth €7.6 billion.

References

External links
 Unión Fenosa website— (company defunct in 2009).
 :Union Fenosa Investing in India" (2008)
 "Union Fenosa´s ongoing dispute in Guatemala" (2010)

Public utilities of Spain
Defunct electric power companies of Spain
Defunct energy companies of Spain
Companies based in the Community of Madrid
Energy companies established in 1982
Non-renewable resource companies established in 1982
Non-renewable resource companies disestablished in 2009
Spanish companies established in 1982
Spanish companies disestablished in 2009